Tennessee College of Applied Technology – Morristown or TCAT Morristown, is a public technical college in the Tennessee Board of Regents' Tennessee Colleges of Applied Technology (TCAT) system located in Morristown, Tennessee, United States.

The college serves nine East Tennessee counties with five campuses offering different programs. With a total of 1,122 students enrolled, it is one of the largest colleges in the TCAT system.

History
With the need of a update because of the rising manufacturing market in Morristown, in late 2019, the college announced a $14 million expansion with the construction of a  advanced manufacturing and mechatronics training facility on the former site of the City of Morristown Public Works Department headquarters, which had relocated to a new facility in West Morristown.

In July 2020, United States Secretary of Labor, Eugene Scalia, visited the college to meet with state and local leaders to highlight economic recovery in manufacturing during the midst of the COVID-19 pandemic.

Academic programs
Each of the Tennessee Colleges of Applied Technology offers programs based on geographic needs of businesses and industry.  Therefore, each college can have different academic programs and offerings. TCAT Morristown students have the opportunity to take the following programs:

 Administrative Office Technology (Offered at main and Surgoinsville extension campus)
 Auto Body Repair Technology
 Automotive Technology
 Aviation Maintenance Technology (Offered at extension campus at Morristown Regional Airport)
 Certified Nursing Assistant
 Computer Information Technology
 Cosmetology (Offered at Greeneville extension campus)
 Drafting and CAD Technology
 Graphic Arts
 Heating
 Ventilation
 Air Conditioning
 Refrigeration
 HVAC-R (Offered at Surgoinsville extension campus)
 Industrial Electricity (Offered at main and Surgoinsville extension campus)
 Industrial Maintenance (Offered at main and Surgoinsville extension campus)
 Machine Tool Technology
 Practical Nursing (Offered at main, Tazewell, and Greeneville extension campus)
 Technology Foundations
 Welding (Offered at main, Surgoinsville, and Greeneville extension campus)

References

External links
 
 Tennessee Board of Regents college profile
 Tennessee Board of Regents

Education in Tennessee
Education in Hamblen County, Tennessee
Buildings and structures in Hamblen County, Tennessee
Public universities and colleges in Tennessee